The Guyanan spiny-rat (Proechimys hoplomyoides) is a spiny rat species found in Brazil, Guyana and Venezuela. The species was first described by George Henry Hamilton Tate in 1939.

Phylogeny
Morphological characters and mitochondrial cytochrome b DNA sequences showed that P. hoplomyoides belongs to the so-called trinitatus group of species of Proechimys, and shares closer phylogenetic affinities with the other members of this clade: P. trinitatus, P. mincae, P. guairae, P. poliopus, P. magdalenae, P. chrysaeolus, and P. urichi.

References

Proechimys
Rodents of South America
Guayana Highlands
Mammals of Brazil
Mammals of Guyana
Mammals of Venezuela
Mammals described in 1939
Taxa named by George Henry Hamilton Tate